A rolling stock company (ROSCO) or rolling stock leasing company owns and maintains railway engines and carriages which are leased to train operating companies who operate the trains.

Africa 
 Sheltam Grindrod
 Swifambo Rail Leasing

Australia
Rail First Asset Management

Europe
Alpha Trains
Macquarie European Rail

United States
Chicago Freight Car Leasing Company (CFCL)

United Kingdom
Angel Trains
Beacon Rail
Europhoenix
Eversholt Rail Group
Porterbrook
Rock Rail

References

Rolling stock leasing companies